Tunde Baiyewu (born Emmanuel Babatunde Baiyewu, 25 November 1968) is a British singer and songwriter of Nigerian descent, best known as the vocalist of Lighthouse Family. In 2004, he embarked on a solo career, releasing the album Tunde. In 2013, he published his second album, Diamond in a Rock.

Early life and career

Tunde Baiyewu was born in London to a middle-class family of Nigerian descent. His father worked as an engineer but died of cancer when Baiyewu was five, after which the boy moved to Nigeria with his mother and younger sister in order for the family to be closer to relatives. Baiyewu learned to speak Yoruba after moving to Nigeria and attended a boarding school near the capital, Lagos. Ten years later, he returned to Britain, attending the University of Northumbria in Newcastle upon Tyne and obtained a degree in accounting. He subsequently met Paul Tucker, who was also at university in Newcastle and working in the bar scene. Their partnership began, and they formed Lighthouse Family.

Lighthouse Family released their debut album, Ocean Drive, with the lead single, "Lifted", reaching the top five on the UK Singles Chart. Ocean Drive was certified six-times Platinum by the end of 1997, selling more than 1.8 million copies in the UK alone and spending 154 weeks on the UK Albums Chart. Lighthouse Family’s follow-up album, Postcards from Heaven, achieved similar sales status in 1997, reaching six-times Platinum status, and Whatever Gets You Through the Day also received Platinum status. The duo has sold over fifteen million albums throughout their career.

In 2004, Baiyewu released his debut solo album, Tunde.

In 2005, he appeared on the BBC Television one-off special Strictly African Dancing. He came last but learned the Bata dance in the process.

On 12 November 2006, Baiyewu appeared in an ITV documentary called Faith in Music. This documentary charted his life and music, from his roots in Africa, through Lighthouse Family and into his solo incarnation. It also showed him performing an acoustic set featuring tracks from his latest album.

In 2013, Baiyewu announced plans for a second solo album, titled Diamond in a Rock, which was released, together with the single "Move", on 4 March 2013.

In October 2013, Baiyewu joined M People as a support act during their "20th Anniversary Greatest Hits Tour".

In 2019, Lighthouse Family released a new album, Blue Sky in Your Head. It was the group's first album in eighteen years and was supported with two sell-out UK tours.

Since 2020, Baiyewu has been working on a new collection of recordings, inspired by the artists and the singer-songwriter era of the 1970s. Reunited with Lighthouse Family producer Mike Peden, he has recorded a selection of Troubadour-influenced songs, including compositing by Elton John, Crosby, Stills, Nash & Young, James Taylor, Leon Russell, Cat Stevens, Van Morrison, David Gates, Bill Withers, Todd Rundgren, and Barry White.

Personal life
After Baiyewu's father's death, his mother went on to marry former Nigerian president Olusegun Obasanjo. She died in 2000.

In March 2007, Baiyewu married Tope Adeshina, a Nigerian model, in Lagos, Nigeria. They live in the UK.

Discography

with Lighthouse Family

Solo

References

External links
 
 Spotlight on Tunde Bayiewu, by Bisola Atinmo
 "From the lighthouse – Tunde". Interview by Will Hodgkinson, The Guardian, 8 October 2004

1965 births
Living people
20th-century Black British male singers
21st-century Black British male singers
English people of Nigerian descent
English people of Yoruba descent
Yoruba musicians
Obasanjo family
Alumni of Northumbria University
Musicians from London